Gryphon Airlines is an American-owned airline based in Vienna, Virginia, United States, in the Washington, D.C. area. It became the first airline to offer scheduled flights to the military side of Baghdad Airport when these flights began in March 2007.

Destinations
Gryphon Airlines operates the following services as of February 2010:

Afghanistan
Kandahar - Kandahar International Airport
Bagram - Bagram Airfield

Bosnia and Herzegovina
Banja Luka - Banja Luka International Airport - charter
Mostar - Mostar International Airport - charter
Sarajevo - Sarajevo International Airport

Iraq
Baghdad - Baghdad International Airport
Najaf - Al Najaf International Airport

Kuwait
Kuwait City - Kuwait International Airport

United Arab Emirates
Dubai - Dubai International Airport
Abu Dhabi - Abu Dhabi International Airport

Fleet
The Gryphon Airlines fleet includes the following aircraft as of 19 March 2011:

References

External links

Companies based in Vienna, Virginia
Charter airlines of the United States
Airlines based in Virginia